Gia Pergolini (born February 3, 2004) is an American Paralympic swimmer who represented the United States at the 2020 Summer Paralympics.

Career
Pergolini made her international debut at the 2017 World Para Swimming Championships where she won a silver medal in the 100 metre backstroke S13. She again represented the United States at the 2019 World Para Swimming Championships where she won a silver medal in the 100 metre backstroke S13. During the 2018 U.S. Paralympics Swimming Para National Championships, she set the American record in the 100 metre backstroke S13 with a time of 1:07.97.

Pergolini, just 17 years old, competed in the women's 100 metre backstroke S13 event at the 2020 Summer Paralympics where she set a world record with a time of 1:05.05 in the qualifying heats. She broke the world record again in the finals with a time of 1:04.64, winning the gold medal.

On April 14, 2022, Pergolini was named to the roster to represent the United States at the 2022 World Para Swimming Championships.

References

External links
 
 
 

2004 births
Living people
American disabled sportspeople
American female backstroke swimmers
Paralympic swimmers of the United States
Paralympic gold medalists for the United States
Paralympic medalists in swimming
Swimmers at the 2020 Summer Paralympics
Medalists at the 2020 Summer Paralympics
Medalists at the World Para Swimming Championships
World record holders in paralympic swimming
Swimmers from Atlanta
American people of Italian descent
21st-century American women
S13-classified Paralympic swimmers